Genalvo da Silva Oliveira (born 5 January 1982) is a Brazilian footballer who plays for Tupi as a midfielder.

References

External links

1982 births
Living people
Association football midfielders
Brazilian footballers
Superettan players
Clube Atlético Mineiro players
Criciúma Esporte Clube players
Ipatinga Futebol Clube players
Santa Cruz Futebol Clube players
Associação Atlética Caldense players
Ljungskile SK players
Brazilian expatriate footballers
Expatriate footballers in Sweden
Brazilian expatriate sportspeople in Sweden